"Bawal Lumabas (The Classroom Song)" or simply "Bawal Lumabas" is a single by Filipina actress and recording artist Kim Chiu. The chorus of the song came from her statement during the live chat event "Laban Kapamilya" as she tried compare ABS-CBN's shutdown to classroom rules. Her comparison went confusing and incoherent instead.

The song was released on May 25, 2020, under the StarPop label.

Background and release
Due to the expiration of congressional franchise of ABS-CBN on May 4, 2020, the National Telecommunications Commission (NTC) and Solicitor General Jose Calida issued a cease-and-desist order on the next day demanding the network to immediately cease all of its free-to-air broadcast operations. With that, several Kapamilya actors and actresses have expressed their dismay regarding the shutdown of the network through online live streaming. One of those live streams is the "Laban, Kapamilya!" event on May 8 through Facebook Live Sessions where Kim Chiu accidentally made a confusing comparison of the law and the ABS-CBN shutdown to classroom dynamics.

English translation

The next day, Chiu posted in her Instagram account that even herself did not understand her "classroom" statement nonetheless, her statement snowballed into a massive deal. Different kinds of internet memes were born including the one with beat created by Squammy Beats in which Chiu's statement have been auto-tuned. The version made by Squammy have been used heavily in several TikTok videos.

For several days, Chiu stayed away from social media as she became a laughing stock online. While friends checked up on Chiu at the height of the meme's spread, it was one stranger's open letter on Facebook that made a mark on the actress. The open letter came from Adrian Crisanto, a marketing professional. Crisanto suggested Chiu to record the "remix" of her video statement that had gone viral, spawning its own classical and rock covers, as well as a TikTok dance challenge. Eventually, Chiu, Crisanto, and original beat creator Squammy Beats collaborated for the "remix" became a full track.

The full version of "Bawal Lumabas" premiered in Chiu's YouTube account on May 18, 2020. After a week, the song was released to Apple Music and Spotify for digital download and online streaming.

Cast and Characters
Kim Chiu as Emerald Tesoro
Francine Diaz as Jade Tesoro
Kyle Echarri as Kevin Ramos
Rafael Rosell as Jonathan "Jonjon" Palma
Paulo Angeles as Onyx Tesoro
Trina Legaspi as Ruby Tesoro
Paeng Sudayan as Papa Pol
Giselle Sanchez as Kap Cheska

Track listing

Criticism by Rodante Marcoleta
On May 26, 2020, during the first hearing for ABS-CBN's franchise renewal application, Sagip Party-list Rep. Rodante Marcoleta, member of the religious organization Iglesia ni Cristo, attributed his objections against renewing ABS-CBN's franchise for 25 years, stating the network committed their violations. Marcoleta used the line to hit out the network.

The netizens expressed dismay on Marcoleta, pointing out the move was completely irrelevant. Marcoleta is one of the 70 representatives who voted "yes" to deny the renewal of ABS-CBN's franchise.

Miniseries
A television miniseries, Bawal Lumabas: The Series (International title: Her Rules, Her No’s), was released online via iWantTFC from December 14–19, 2020, with television broadcast on Kapamilya Channel and A2Z from June 19 to July 24, 2021, replacing Aja! Aja! Tayo sa Jeju and was replaced by Hoy, Love You!. The miniseries stars Kim Chiu, Francine Diaz, Kyle Echarri, Rafael Rosell, Trina "Hopia" Legaspi and Paulo Angeles.

References

2020 singles
Taglish songs
Internet memes
Internet humor